Mei County or Meixian is a county under the jurisdiction of the prefecture-level city of Baoji, in the west of Shaanxi province, China. It is one of the birthplaces of the Western Zhou culture, during which it was known as Taiguo (邰国). In 794 BC Duke Zhuang of Qin established a town known as Yiyi at its location. During the Eastern Han dynasty it became known as Yinwu. In 2003, 27 Zhou culture bronze ding vessels an other bronzeware were found in Lijia village of Mei County.

Nowadays Mei County is known for its kiwifruit cultivation and trout and carp aquaculture.

Administrative divisions
As 2020, this County is divided to 1 subdistrict, 7 towns and 2 others.
Subdistricts
 Shoushan Subdistrict
Towns

Others
 Shaanxi Mount Taibai Scenic Area
 Honghegu Forest Park

Climate

References

County-level divisions of Shaanxi